Gogana fragilis is a moth in the family Drepanidae first described by Swinhoe in 1902. It is found on Borneo.

Adults are dark shining grey with a red-brown streak at the end of the cell on the forewings, as well as some minute silvery specks along the costa, in the cell and interspace below the subcostal vein and along the outer margin. The marginal borders of both wings are dark.

References

Moths described in 1902
Drepaninae